The American Journal of Play is a peer-reviewed interdisciplinary academic journal that covers the history, science, and culture of play. The journal includes articles, interviews, and book reviews written for a broad readership of educators, scholars, designers, and others.

References

External links 
 

Play (activity)
Education journals
Quarterly journals
Publications established in 2008
English-language journals